The 2021/22 Edition of the NIHL National League involved 9 teams from across the United Kingdom.

Season Overview 
The NIHL National hosted 4 tournaments across the season:

 National Autumn Cup
 National Cup
 National League
 National Playoffs

National Autumn Cup 

The National Autumn Cup was hosted between the 17th September and 23rd November 2021, each team playing each other once in the group stage (either home or away) totalling 8 matches.

Group stage 
The Group Stage took place between 17th September and 10th October 2021 Teams receive 2 points for a win and 1 point for an overtime loss. In the event that two or more teams were tied on points, goal difference was used to determine the rankings.

Knockouts 
The Knockouts took place between 11th November and 23rd December 2021. Since Sheffield Steeldogs placed 1st in the Group Stage, they got to select their Semi-Final opponent and chose Leeds Knights Matches were played over two legs, one home and one away with the aggregate score (shown in bold) the decider of who advances. If it was level after the 120 minutes of play, 5 minutes of overtime was played and if still not tied it went to a shootout.

Final rankings

Leaders

National Cup 

The National Cup was hosted between the 16th October 2021 and 2nd January 2022. These matches were the same matches that counted towards the National League, the first time each team player each other home and away.

Group stage 
The Group Stage took place between 16th October 2021 and 2nd January 2022. Teams receive 2 points for a win and 1 point for an overtime loss. In the event that two or more teams were tied on points, goal difference was used to determine the rankings.

Knockouts 
Since Swindon Wildcats placed 1st in the Group Stage, they got to select their Semi-Final opponent and chose Sheffield Steeldogs Matches were played over two legs, one home and one away with the aggregate score (shown in bold) the decider of who advances. If it was level after the 120 minutes of play, 5 minutes of overtime was played and if still tied it went to a shootout.

Final rankings

National League 

The National League makes the majority of the games within the season, with each time playing each other a total of 6 times, 3 home and 3 away. The top 8 teams also qualify for the National Playoffs, with the 9th team missing out

*Raiders IHC were deducted 3 points for failure to fulfill a fixture on the 19th December 2021

(Q) Qualified for the National League Playoffs

National League Playoffs

Group stage 
The 8 teams that make it to the playoffs are split into two group, Group A and B based on their placing in the National League. Each team plays each other twice, one at home and once away. The top 2 from each group proceed to the Final 4 Weekend.

References 

Ice hockey in England
Ice hockey in Scotland
Ice hockey in Wales
Ice hockey in Northern Ireland